Cunninghamella is a genus of fungi in the order Mucorales, and the family Cunninghamellaceae. The genus was circumscribed by French mycologist Alphonse Louis Paul Matruchot in Ann. Mycol. Vol.1 on page 47 in 1903.

The genus name of Cunninghamella is in honour of David Douglas Cunningham (1843–1914), who was a Scottish doctor and researcher who worked extensively in India on various aspects of public health and medicine.

Species
, Index Fungorum lists 13 valid species of Cunninghamella:
Cunninghamella  bertholletiae
Cunninghamella binarieae R.Y.Zheng 2001
Cunninghamella blakesleeana 
Cunninghamella candida Yosh.Yamam. 1929
Cunninghamella clavata R.Y.Zheng & G.Q.Chen 1998
Cunninghamella echinulata (Thaxt.) Thaxt. ex Blakeslee 1905
Cunninghamella elegans Lendn. 1905
Cunninghamella homothallica Komin. & Tubaki 1952
Cunninghamella intermedia K.B.Deshp. & Mantri 1966
Cunninghamella multiverticillata R.Y.Zheng & G.Q. Chen 2001
Cunninghamella phaeospora Boedijn 1959
Cunninghamella polymorpha Pišpek 1929
Cunninghamella septata R.Y.Zheng 2001
Cunninghamella vesiculosa P.C.Misra 1966

Uses
Members of this genus are often used in studies investigating the metabolism of drugs, because these species metabolize a wide range of drugs in manners similar to mammalian enzyme systems.  Many species are also capable of oxidizing polycyclic aromatic hydrocarbons, a class of stable organic molecules that tends to persist in the environment and contains many known carcinogenic and mutagenic compounds.

The presence of a cytochrome P450 has been demonstrated in C. bainieri.

References

Cunninghamellaceae
Zygomycota genera